"Stop the World" is a song by Australian rock band The Screaming Jets. The song was released in June 1991 as the second single from their debut studio album All for One (1991). The song peaked at number 33 on the ARIA Charts.

Track listings
 CD Single/ 7"
 "Stop the World" - 4:28	
 "Time and Time" - 2:43

Charts

Release history

References

1990 songs
1991 singles
The Screaming Jets songs